Mamadou Chérif Dia (born 16 October 1984) is a Malian athlete specialising in the long jump and triple jump. He won a bronze medal at the 2015 African Games.

His personal bests are 7.82 metres in the long jump (-0.9 m/s, Bamako 2010) and 16.55 metres in the triple jump (+0.3, Brazzaville 2015). Both results are current national records.

Competition record

References

1984 births
Living people
Malian male long jumpers
Athletes (track and field) at the 2015 African Games
Athletes (track and field) at the 2019 African Games
Athletes (track and field) at the 2016 Summer Olympics
Olympic athletes of Mali
Malian male triple jumpers
African Games bronze medalists for Mali
African Games medalists in athletics (track and field)
Olympic male triple jumpers
Competitors at the 2007 Summer Universiade
21st-century Malian people